Club Deportivo Cacahuatique  is a Salvadoran professional football club based in Ciudad Barrios, san Miguel,  El Salvador tournament champion apertura 2018.

The club currently plays in the Segunda Division de Fútbol Salvadoreño.

The club was founded in 1968.

Honours

Domestic honours
 Segunda División Salvadorean and predecessors 
 Champions (0) : TBD
 Tercera División Salvadorean and predecessors 
 Champions:(1) :2018 
 Liga ADFAS and predecessors 
 Champions:(1) : TBD

Current squad

List of coaches
  Marvin Hernández (2017)
  Willian Chevez (2018–)
  Omar Sevilla (2019) 
  Efrain Solano
  Omar Sevilla (June 2021-Present)

References

External links
 

Cacahuatique